Julia Schruff (born 16 August 1982) is a retired professional German tennis player.

Career 
Her career high WTA-ranking was attained on 17 April 2006, when she reached No. 52. Her highest doubles ranking was reached on 2 October 2006, when she reached No. 99.

She enjoyed her breakthrough in 2003 when she reached the final at the Estoril Open in Portugal as a qualifier.

During her career, she has beaten two Top 10-ranked players so far – Anastasia Myskina at the 2005 Qatar Total German Open and Elena Dementieva at the 2006 Australian Open. She also has notched wins against top players such as Jelena Janković, Katarina Srebotnik, Flavia Pennetta, Jelena Dokić, Elena Likhovtseva and Alona Bondarenko.

Schruff has won her first ITF tournament in Latina, Lazio, where she defeated fellow German Andrea Petkovic in the final.

WTA career finals

Singles: 1 (0-1)

Doubles: 2 (0-2)

ITF finals

Singles (2-5)

Doubles (5–5)

External links 

 Julia Schruff's official website
 
 
 

1982 births
Living people
Sportspeople from Augsburg
German female tennis players
Tennis people from Bavaria